The 2000 IFA Shield Final was the 106th final of the IFA Shield, the second oldest football competition in India, and was contested between Kolkata giants East Bengal and Mohun Bagan on 16 September 2000.

East Bengal won the final 4–1 via penalties after the game ended 1–1 after extra-time, to claim their 25th IFA Shield title.

Route to the final

East Bengal

East Bengal entered the 2000 IFA Shield as one of the National Football League teams from Kolkata and were allocated into Group A alongside BNR, JCT and Calcutta Port Trust. In the opening game against BNR on 5 September, East Bengal managed a 1–0 victory courtesy of a solitary goal from Bijen Singh. In the second game, East Bengal defeated JCT 3–0 with a brace from Dipendu Biswas and Bijen Singh scoring the third for the team. East Bengal defeated Calcuta Port Trust 3–0 in the last game of the group stage with Dipendu Biswas scoring another brace and Bijen Singh scoring in third consecutive match as East Bengal topped the group with three wins and reached the last four. In the semi-finals, East Bengal defeated Tollygunge Agragami 1–0 courtesy of a solitary strike from Surkumar Singh as they reached the final.

Mohun Bagan

Mohun Bagan entered the 2000 IFA Shield as the defending champions and were allocated into Group B alongside State Bank of Travancore, George Telegraph and Tollygunge Agragami. In the opening game, Mohun Bagan defeated State Bank of Travancore 3–1 with Jose Ramirez Barreto scoring a brace and an own goal from Paul Anthony. Sylvester Ignatius scored the only goal for SBT. Mohun Bagan defeated George Telegraph 3–0 in the second match. Jose Barreto, R. C. Prakash and Satyajit Chatterjee scored for the team. In the last match of the group stage, Mohun Bagan drew 1–1 with Tollygunge Agragami after Bhabani Mohanty scored an early goal for Tollygunge only to be equalised by Jose Barreto in the second half as Mohun Bagan topped the group with two wins and a draw to reach the last four. In the semi-finals, Mohun Bagan defeated JCT 1–0 with Basudeb Mondal scoring the only goal taking them to the final.

Match

Details

See also
 IFA Shield 2000, rsssf.com
 IFA Shield 2000, indianfootball.de

References

IFA Shield finals
2000–01 in Indian football
East Bengal Club matches
Mohun Bagan AC matches
Football competitions in Kolkata